P. K. Velayudhan was the Minister for Community Development in third K. Karunakaran Ministry in Kerala.

He was born to Kunjayyappan on 4 September 1946. He married P.V. Girija.

Political life 
P. K. Velayudhan was the prominent Dalit leader of Communist Party of India (Marxist) in Kerala. He was the State President of Bharatiya Depressed Class League. He was the General Secretary of the Kerala State Committee of Bharatiya Depressed Class League. He was the State President of Harijan Youth League, State Harijan Students League. He was a member of State Harijan Advisory Committee. He was part of the Youth Congress State Executive as well.

Velayudhan was a member of Kerala Pradesh Congress Committee. He was a member of Kerala University Senate, and the President of Kerala Aquatic Association and KSRTC United Labour Organisation.

He was elected to Kerala Legislative Assembly in 1980 from Pandalam State Assembly Constituency and later in 1982 from Njarakkal State Assembly Constituency. He was the Chairman of Committee on the Welfare of Scheduled Caste and Scheduled Tribe during 1980 to 1982.

References 

Indian National Congress (U) politicians
Indian National Congress politicians from Kerala
1946 births
2003 deaths